The 1992–93 Kazakhstan Hockey Championship was the first season of the Kazakhstan Hockey Championship, the top level of ice hockey in Kazakhstan. Four teams participated in the league, and Torpedo Ust-Kamenogorsk won the championship.

Standings

References
Kazakh Ice Hockey Federation

Kazakhstan Hockey Championship
Kazakhstan Hockey Championship seasons
Kaz